Pachyticon brunneum is a species of beetle in the family Cerambycidae, and the only species in the genus Pachyticon. It was described by Thomson in 1857.

References

Dorcasominae
Beetles described in 1857
Monotypic beetle genera